The East African shilling was the sterling unit of account in British controlled areas of East Africa from 1921 until 1969. It was issued by the East African Currency Board. It is also the proposed name for a common currency that the East African Community plans to introduce.

The shilling was divided into 100 cents, and twenty shillings were 1 pound.

History

First East African shilling

Unlike elsewhere in the possessions of the British Empire that used sterling, in British East Africa the shilling instead of the pound was the primary unit of account, with the pound being a superunit mainly used for recording very large sums of money that would be inconvenient if quoted solely in shillings.

This anomalous state of affairs arose because the first currency used by the British colonial authorities in British East Africa was the rupee, not sterling. The East African shilling was introduced to Kenya, Tanganyika, and Uganda in 1921, replacing the short-lived East African florin at a rate of 2 shillings to 1 florin. The florin had been introduced because of increasing silver prices after World War I. At that time, the Indian rupee was the currency of the British East African states. The rupee, being a silver coin, rose in value against sterling. When it reached the value of two shillings, the authorities decided to replace it with the florin. From the florin thence came the East African shilling. The currency remained pegged to one shilling sterling and was subdivided into 100 cents. It was replaced by local currencies (Kenyan shilling, Ugandan shilling, and Tanzanian shilling) following the territories' independence.

In 1951, the East African shilling replaced the Indian rupee in the Aden colony and protectorate, which became the South Arabian Federation in 1963.

The shilling was also used in parts of what is now Somalia, Ethiopia, and Eritrea when they were under British control. Before 1941, these areas, then known as Italian East Africa, used the Italian East African lira. Italian Somaliland was returned to Italy in 1949 as a UN Trusteeship and soon switched to the somalo, which was at par with the shilling. British Somaliland gained independence in 1960, and joined what had been Italian Somaliland to create Somalia. In that year, Somalia began using the Somali shilling (replacing the Somali somalo) at par with the East African shilling.

Ethiopia regained independence in 1941, with British support, and began using the East African shilling. Maria Theresa thalers, Indian rupees, and Egyptian pounds were also legal tender at the beginning of this time, and it is unclear exactly when this status ended. Full sovereignty was restored in late 1944, and the Ethiopian dollar was reintroduced in 1945 at a rate of $1 = . Eritrea was captured from the Italians in 1941, and began using the East African shilling, as well as the Egyptian pound. The lira was demonetised in 1942. When Eritrea formed a federation with Ethiopia in 1952, the dollar, which was already in use in Ethiopia, was also adopted in Eritrea.

Second East African shilling

A revived version of the currency has been proposed by the East African Community, which consists of Kenya, Tanzania, Uganda, Rwanda, Burundi, South Sudan, and the Democratic Republic of the Congo.

It had been proposed that the Second East African shilling would be introduced into circulation in 2012, but the target was not met. A second target date of 2015 was set, but that was not met either. The third target date is 2024.

Coins

Issued during the reign of George V

Issued during the reign of Edward VIII

Issued during the reign of George VI

As GEORGIVS VI

As GEORGIVS SEXTVS

Issued during the reign of Elizabeth II

Issued after independence

Banknotes

In 1943,  notes were issued, the only occasion that such notes were produced.  notes were only issued until 1933, with  notes last issued in 1947. The remaining denominations were issued until 1964.

Shilling denominations were written on banknotes in English, Arabic, and Gujarati, while values in pounds were written in English only.

Gallery

See also

 British currency in the Middle East

References

 
 

The last issued 10,000/= note was dated 1 August 1951 but the high denomination note was used for clearing internally for many years after 1951.

External links
 East African Community
 Images of East African banknotes

|-

|-

|-

Currencies of Somalia
British Somaliland
East African Community
Modern obsolete currencies
Currencies of the British Empire
Currencies of the Commonwealth of Nations
Currency unions
Currencies introduced in 1921
1969 disestablishments
20th century in Africa
20th-century economic history
Currencies of Kenya
Currencies of Somaliland
Currencies of Tanzania
Currencies of Uganda
Currencies of Yemen